Promodal Transportes Aéreos was a short-lived cargo airline based in São Paulo, Brazil.

Code data

ICAO Code: GPT
Callsign: Promodal

History

The airline was established in 2003 and was wholly owned by Grupo GPT. Operations ceased in 2004, and the company was subsequently dissolved.

Fleet

The Promodal fleet consisted  of one McDonnell Douglas DC-8 aircraft (as of January 2005).

See also
List of defunct airlines of Brazil

References

Defunct airlines of Brazil
Airlines established in 2003
Airlines disestablished in 2004